Cannonball Takes Charge is an album by jazz saxophonist Cannonball Adderley released on the Riverside label featuring performances by Adderley with Wynton Kelly, Paul Chambers, and Jimmy Cobb with Percy and Albert Heath replacing Chambers and Cobb on two selections.

Reception

The Penguin Guide to Jazz said that "Cannonball Takes Charge is perhaps only ordinary." The AllMusic review by Ken Dryden awarded the album 4 stars and states: "Cannonball Adderley is in top form on this 1959 release."

Track listing 
All compositions by Julian "Cannonball" Adderley except as indicated
 "If This Isn't Love" (Burton Lane, E.Y. "Yip" Harburg) – 5:32
 "I Guess I'll Hang My Tears out to Dry" (Jule Styne, Sammy Cahn) – 5:34
 "Serenata" (Leroy Anderson) – 4:16
 "I've Told Ev'ry Little Star" (Jerome Kern, Oscar Hammerstein II) – 3:39
 "Barefoot Sunday Blues" – 7:03
 "Poor Butterfly" (Raymond Hubbell, John Golden) – 5:10
 "I Remember You" (Victor Schertzinger, Johnny Mercer) – 6:55
 "Barefoot Sunday Blues" [alternative take] – 7:48 Bonus track on CD
 "I Remember You" [alternative take] (Schertzinger, Mercer) – 6:52 Bonus track on CD
 Recorded at Reeves Sound Studio in New York City on April 23 (track 4), April 27 (tracks 1-3) and May 12 (tracks 5-9), 1959

Personnel 
 Cannonball Adderley - alto saxophone
 Wynton Kelly - piano
 Paul Chambers - bass (tracks 1-4)
 Jimmy Cobb - drums (tracks 1-4)
 Percy Heath - bass (tracks 5-9)
 Albert "Tootie" Heath - drums (tracks 5-9)

References 

1959 albums
Riverside Records albums
Cannonball Adderley albums
Albums produced by Orrin Keepnews